Charles Gardner Rought (16 October 1884 – 31 January 1919) was a British rower who competed in the 1912 Summer Olympics.

Life
Rought was born in Surbiton. He became a member of Thames Rowing Club and in 1909 and 1911 was a member of the crew that won the Stewards' Challenge Cup at Henley Royal Regatta. Also in the 1911 regatta, Rought and Bruce Logan dead heated in a heat of Silver Goblets against the eventual winners Julius Beresford and Arthur Cloutte to set a course record which lasted until 1934. A year later in 1912 Rought and Logan won Silver Goblets.  Rought was a member of the Thames Rowing Club coxed four which won the silver medal for Great Britain rowing at the 1912 Summer Olympics.

Rought saw service in the First World War in the Royal West Surrey Regiment but spent much of the conflict as a Prisoner of War.  Rought died in the Lambeth district aged 34.  The cause of death was a bad oyster.  Since Rought was awaiting demobilisation at the time, he technically died on active service.

Achievements

Olympic Games
 1912 - Silver, Coxed Four

Henley Royal Regatta
 1909 - Stewards' Challenge Cup
 1911 - Stewards' Challenge Cup
 1912 - Silver Goblets & Nickalls' Challenge Cup (with Bruce Logan)
 1919 Victory Regatta – Fawley Cup

References

External links
Profile on Charles Rought

1884 births
1919 deaths
British male rowers
Olympic rowers of Great Britain
Rowers at the 1912 Summer Olympics
Olympic silver medallists for Great Britain
British Army personnel of World War I
Olympic medalists in rowing
Medalists at the 1912 Summer Olympics
Queen's Royal Regiment soldiers
British military personnel killed in World War I
British World War I prisoners of war
World War I prisoners of war held by Germany
Military personnel from Surrey